The following is a list of episodes for Bushiroad's Future Card Buddyfight anime series. It began in Japan on TV Tokyo and affiliate channels on January 4, 2014, at 8:00 AM. Right after the Japanese broadcast, it is simulcasted and dubbed in English on YouTube and Hulu that same day. Crunchyroll joined the English dub premieres on April 25.

The series takes place in the year 2030. In addition to Earth where humans reside, there are other worlds where monsters exist. Certain humans and monsters can become "buddies" with each other and play against other Buddyfighters through the card game Future Card Buddyfight. The story follows Gao Mikado and his adventures in Buddyfight after becoming buddies with Drum Bunker Dragon.

The anime uses three pieces of theme music: two opening themes and three ending themes. The first opening theme from episode 1 to 46 was "Card of the Future" by Psychic Lover and Suara. The second and final opening from episode 47 to 64 was "Buddy Buddy BAAAAAN!!" by Marie Mizuno (as Gao Mikado) and Shuta Morishima (as Baku Omori). The second opening theme was not shown in the English version; instead, "Card of the Future" was shown. The first ending theme from episode 1 to 24 was "Buddy Buddy Fight!" by Sora Tokui (as Paruko Nanana) in the Japanese version and by Jenny Shima in the English dub. The second ending theme from episode 25 to 46 was "Natsuiro Fighting!!" by Sora Tokui (as Paruko Nanana). She also sang the English version for the dub which was included as a bonus track in the single. The third ending theme from episode 47 to 64 was "Shiny Up!" by Suzuko Mimori (as Hanako Mikado) and Jenny Shima in the English dub.

Future Card Buddyfight Hundred's first opening theme from episodes 1 to 21 was "Luminize" by fripSide in Japanese and Hannah Grace in English. The second opening from episodes 22 to 48 is "Beyond the limits" by Hideyuki Takahashi. The first ending theme from episodes 1 to 21 was "Buddy Lights" by Soma Saito in Japanese and Jovetta Rivera in English. The second ending theme from episode 22 to 50 is "Milky 100 World" by Milky Holmes. The second opening and ending theme are not shown in the English version.

From October 2, 2015, to March 25, 2017, dubbing was skipped for reasons unknown. Dubbing of the series was paused for the second half of Hundred (season 2, starting with episode 26) and the entirety of Triple D (Season 3). Dubbing resumed from X's first episode (season 4) and has continued since. Treated as episodes 90-165 for the whole series, the 76 skipped Future Card Buddyfight episodes remain undubbed.

Future Card Buddyfight Triple D's first opening theme from episodes 1 to 27 was "Chronograph" by Natsuhiro Takaaki. The second opening theme from episodes 28 to 51 is "DDD" by Shouta Aoi. The first ending theme from episodes 1 to 27 was "Wakey☆Thump SHOOTER" by Sora Tokui. The second ending theme from episode 28 to 39 is "Yume no Hikari-kun no Mirai" by Aina Aiba. The third ending theme from episode 40 to 51 is "Unite (Live Forever)" by British duo Bars and Melody.

Future Card Buddyfight X's first opening theme from episodes 1 to 29 is "Brave Soul Fight!" by Sora Tokui and Shūta Morishima. They performed both Japanese and English versions. The second opening theme from episode 30 to 52 is "Buddyfighter x Buddyfighter" by Jun Shirota. The first ending theme from episodes 1 to 29 is "Fight Against the Wind" (known in Japanese as "Mukai Kaze ni Fight") by Ayana Kinoshita (both Japanese and English). The second opening theme from episodes 30 to 52 is "B.O.F" by Poppin'Party.

Future Card Buddyfight Ace's opening theme is "Saa Ikō!" ("Let's Go!") by Poppin'Party (Japanese and English). The first ending theme was "Buddy☆Funny Days" by Takumi Mano, Daiki Kobayashi & Shuuta Morishima (Japanese) and Brian P (English) from episodes 1 to 22. The second ending theme from episode 23 to 43 is Niji no Yakusoku by Shuuta Morishima.

Future Card Buddyfight
Opening themes
 "Card of the Future" by Psychic Lover and Suara (eps. 1-46) (Original Japanese) / (eps. 1-63) (English Dub)
 "Buddy Buddy BAAAAAN!!" by Marie Mizuno & Shuta Morishima (eps. 47–63) 
Ending themes
 "Buddy Buddy Fight!" by Sora Tokui (eps. 1-24)
 "Natsuiro Fighting!!" by Sora Tokui (eps. 25–46)
 "Shiny Up!" by Suzuko Mimori (eps. 47–64)

Future Card Buddyfight Hundred
Opening theme
 "Luminize" by fripSide (eps. 1-21) (Original Japanese) / (eps. 1-48) (English Dub)
 "Beyond the Limit" by Hideyuki Takahashi (eps. 22–48)
Ending theme
 "Buddy Lights" by Saitou Souma (eps. 1-21) (Original Japanese) / (eps. 1-50) (English Dub)
 "Milky 100 World" by Milky Holmes (eps. 22–50)

Future Card Buddyfight Triple D
The entirety of this season did not get a dub translation,  it was also confirmed at the time before it aired that there were no plans to have it dubbed.

Opening theme
Chronograph by Natsuhiro Takaaki (eps. 1-27)
DDD by Shouta Aoi (eps. 28–51)
Ending theme
Wakey☆Thump SHOOTER by Sora Tokui (eps. 1-27)
Yume no Hikari-kun no Mirai by Aina Aiba (eps. 28–39)
Unite (Live Forever) by Bars and Melody (eps. 40–51)

Future Card Buddyfight X
After the lengthy hiatus from season 2 episode 26 to the season 3 finale; the English dub finally returns from the start of this season.

Opening theme
Brave Soul Fight! by Sora Tokui and Shūta Morishima (eps. 1-29)
Buddyfighter x Buddyfighter by Jun Shirota (eps. 30–52)
Ending theme
Mukai Kaze ni Fight! (Fight Against the Wind") by Ayana Kinoshita (eps. 1-29)
B.O.F by Poppin'Party (eps. 30–52)

Future Card Buddyfight X All Star Fight
Opening Theme
Buddyfighter x Buddyfighter by Jun Shirota (eps. 53–60)
Ending Theme
B.O.F by Poppin'Party (eps. 53–60)

Future Card Buddyfight Ace
Opening Theme
Saikō (Sā Ikō)! (Let's Go!) by Poppin' Party (eps. 1-43)
Ending Theme
Buddy☆Funny Days by Takumi Mano (as Yuga Mikado) & Kobayashi Daiki (as Subaru Hoshiyomi) & Shūta Morishima (as Masato Rikuo) (Japanese) Brian P (English) (eps. 1-22)
Niji no Yakusoku by Shūta Morishima (eps. 23–43)

References

Future Card Buddyfight